Franklin Regional Senior High School is a public high school (grades 9–12) in Murrysville, Pennsylvania and is part of the Franklin Regional School District.

History

On April 9, 2014, Franklin was the site of a mass stabbing and slashing incident that wounded 21 students and a security guard. Eight of the students were wounded seriously. A 16-year-old student, Alex Hribal, was arrested and charged with attempted homicide and aggravated assault.

In January 2018, after pleading guilty to 21 counts of attempted homicide and aggravated assault, Alex Hribal was sentenced to 23.5 to 60 years in prison and fined $269,000 in restitution.

Athletics 
Franklin offers the following sports through the Pennsylvania Interscholastic Athletic Association (District 7):

{| class="wikitable sortable"
!colspan="3"|Franklin Sports
|-
! Gender
! Sport
! Class
|-
|- style="background: skyblue;
| Boys || Baseball || AAAAA
|- style="background: skyblue;
| Boys || Basketball || AAAAA
|- style="background: skyblue;
| Boys || Cross Country || AAA
|- style="background: skyblue;
| Boys || Football || AAAAA
|- style="background: skyblue;
| Boys || Golf || AAA
|- style="background: skyblue;
| Boys || Lacrosse || AA
|- style="background: skyblue;
| Boys || Soccer || AAA
|- style="background: skyblue;
| Boys || Swimming and Diving || AAA
|- style="background: skyblue;
| Boys || Tennis || AAA
|- style="background: skyblue;
| Boys || Track and Field || AAA
|- style="background: skyblue;
| Boys || Wrestling || AAA
|- style="background: pink;
| Girls || Basketball || AAAAA
|- style="background: pink;
| Girls || Competitive Spirit || AAA
|- style="background: pink;
| Girls || Cross Country || AAA
|- style="background: pink;
| Girls || Golf || AAA
|- style="background: pink;
| Girls || Lacrosse || AA
|- style="background: pink;
| Girls || Soccer || AAA
|- style="background: pink;
| Girls || Softball || AAAAA
|- style="background: pink;
| Girls || Swimming and Diving || AAA
|- style="background: pink;
| Girls || Tennis || AAA
|- style="background: pink;
| Girls || Track and Field || AAA
|- style="background: pink;
| Girls || Volleyball || AAA
|}

Notable alumni
 Julie Benz – actress
 Courtney Hazlett – journalist
 Sean Hickey – American football player
 Spencer Lee – wrestler
 John Malecki – American football player
 John F. Meier – U.S. Navy aviator and rear admiral 
 Tom Ricketts – American football player
 Manu Narayan – Broadway actor

References

External links
 

Schools in Westmoreland County, Pennsylvania
Public high schools in Pennsylvania